Fernando Fanjul (born 12 December 1941) is an Argentine former swimmer. He competed in the men's 200 metre butterfly at the 1960 Summer Olympics.

References

1941 births
Living people
Argentine male swimmers
Olympic swimmers of Argentina
Swimmers at the 1960 Summer Olympics
Swimmers from Buenos Aires
Argentine male butterfly swimmers
20th-century Argentine people